Club Atlético Trinidad is an Argentine Football club based in San Juan, in the San Juan Province of Argentina. They currently play in Zone 5 of the regionalised 4th level of Argentine football Torneo Argentino B.

The club was founded in 1980 as a merger between Club Atlético Independiente (San Juan) and Club Atlético Los Andes. Los Andes had won the Liga Sanjuanina de futbol on 4 occasions and in 1977 qualified for the Nacional championship, finishing 4th in their group.

References

External links
Official website
Soy del Leon

 
T
T
T